Kritsana Kasemkulvilai (born September 15, 1990) is a Thai professional footballer who plays as a midfielder for Thai League 2 club Lampang.

Honours

Club
Chiangrai United
 Thai League 1: 2019
Nongbua Pitchaya
 Thai League 2: 2020–21

References

External links

1990 births
Living people
Kritsana Kasemkulvilai
Kritsana Kasemkulvilai
Association football midfielders
Kritsana Kasemkulvilai
Kritsana Kasemkulvilai
Kritsana Kasemkulvilai
Kritsana Kasemkulvilai